C2H or C2H may refer to:

Science 
 Ethynyl radical, an organic compound with the chemical formula C≡CH (also written [CCH] or C2H)
 Cinnamate/coumarate 2-hydroxylase, an enzyme in the umbellic acid biosynthesis pathway
 Candida two-hybrid (C2H) system, a variant of the yeast two-hybrid (Y2H) system

Other uses 
 Cinema2Home, a cinema distribution platform founded by Cheran
 Contract-to-hire, a form of temporary work

References